Toni Kristian "Tony" Kakko (born 16 May 1975) is a Finnish musician, composer and vocalist. He is known as the vocalist, primary songwriter, and creative lead of the band Sonata Arctica since 1996.

Biography

Kakko was born in Kemi, Finland and joined Sonata Arctica in 1996, after studying keyboards for two years and singing informally in local festivals. He initially performed both the keyboards and the vocals, but after the release of the band's first album, decided to concentrate on singing with the joining of Mikko Härkin. The bands Queen, Stratovarius, Children of Bodom and Nightwish are amongst his biggest musical influences. Kakko also states the season of winter as one of his influences. His singing style is clean and generally high-pitched. He sings in the tenors range, and has begun to scream on later releases with Sonata, especially The Days of Grays, but also some screams in the background on Unia.

Kakko appeared as a guest male vocalist in Nightwish's 2001 remake of their song "Astral Romance", which appeared on the EP Over the Hills and Far Away. He also sang backing vocals on the song "Over the Hills and Far Away" and sang a duet with Tarja Turunen on the live version of "Beauty and the Beast." Kakko appears on stage with Tarja performing "Beauty and the Beast," on Nightwish's live DVD From Wishes to Eternity. He performed guest vocals in the song "Wasted Time" from Heavenly's album Virus and backing vocals for Before the Bleeding Sun, the fifth album of the Finnish band Eternal Tears of Sorrow, and Epica's song White Waters from the album Design Your Universe. More recently, he has been involved with a project Northern Kings, in which he, along with Juha-Pekka Leppäluoto (Charon), Marko Hietala (Tarot, Nightwish) and Jarkko Ahola (Teräsbetoni) sings covers of classics from decades past.

In July 2015, it was announced that Kakko would replace Jukka Nevalainen as Nightwish's special guest at the 2015 edition of Rock in Rio.

In December of 2018, Kakko was awarded with the title of Knight of The Order of The Lion of Finland.

Selected discography

Sonata Arctica

 Ecliptica – 1999
 Silence – 2001
 Winterheart's Guild – 2003
 Reckoning Night – 2004
 Unia – 2007
 The Days of Grays – 2009
 Stones Grow Her Name – 2012
 Pariah's Child – 2014
 The Ninth Hour - 2016
 Talviyö - 2019

Northern Kings
 Reborn – 2007
 Rethroned – 2008

Guest appearances
 Nightwish – Over the Hills and Far Away – 2001
 Nightwish – From Wishes to Eternity (DVD) – 2001
 Heavenly – Virus – 2006
 Eternal Tears of Sorrow – Before the Bleeding Sun – 2006
 Nuclear Blast All-Stars: Into the Light – 2007
 Apocalyptica – Live Vocalist (Finland and Japan) – 2008, 2009
 Elias Viljanen – Fire-Hearted – 2009
 Stratovarius – Polaris – 2009
 Epica – Design Your Universe – 2009
 Van Canto – "Hearted", on Tribe of Force – 2010
 Powerglove – Saturday Morning Apocalypse – 2010
  Avalon – "We Will Find a Way", on The Land of New Hope – 2013
 Tuomas Holopainen – Music Inspired by the Life and Times of Scrooge – 2014
 Dark Sarah – "Light in You" on Behind The Black Veil – 2015
 Hevisaurus – "100" – 2019
 Lordi – "Rollercoaster" on Lordiversity'' – 2021
 Jani Liimatainen - "All Dreams Are Born to Die " on "My Father’s Son" - 2022

References

External links
 Sonata Arctica's official website

1975 births
Finnish heavy metal singers
21st-century Finnish male singers
Finnish male singer-songwriters
Finnish tenors
Finnish heavy metal keyboardists
Sonata Arctica members
Living people
People from Kemi
English-language singers from Finland
Northern Kings members
20th-century Finnish male singers